Compassion motivates people to go out of their way to relieve the physical, mental, or emotional pains of others and themselves. Compassion is often regarded as being sensitive to the emotional aspects of the suffering of others. When based on notions such as fairness, justice, and interdependence, it may be considered rational in nature.

The word "compassion" comes from Middle English, and derives from Old French, via ecclesiastical Latin compassio(n- ), from compati (‘to suffer with’).

Compassion involves "feeling for another" and is a precursor to empathy, the "feeling as another" capacity (as opposed to sympathy, the "feeling towards another"). In common parlance, active compassion is the desire to alleviate another's suffering.

Compassion involves allowing ourselves to be moved by suffering, and experiencing the motivation to help alleviate and prevent it. An act of compassion is defined by its helpfulness. Qualities of compassion are patience and wisdom; kindness and perseverance; warmth and resolve. It is often, though not inevitably, the key component in what manifests in the social context as altruism. Expression of compassion is prone to be hierarchical, paternalistic, and controlling in responses. The difference between sympathy and compassion is that the former responds to others' suffering with sorrow and concern whereas the latter responds with warmth and care. An article by the Clinical Psychology Review suggests that "compassion consists of three facets: noticing, feeling, and responding."

The English noun compassion, meaning to suffer together with, comes from Latin. Its prefix com- comes directly from com, an archaic version of the Latin preposition and affix cum (= with); the -passion segment is derived from passus, past participle of the deponent verb patior, patī, passus sum. Compassion is thus related in origin, form and meaning to the English noun patient (= one who suffers), from patiens, present participle of the same patior, and is akin to the Greek verb πάσχειν (= paskhein, to suffer) and to its cognate noun πάθος (= pathos). Ranked a great virtue in numerous philosophies, compassion is considered in almost all the major religious traditions as among the greatest of virtues.

Theories on conceptualizing compassion 
Theoretical perspectives of compassion have been developed through the years, the following proposed perspectives show contrasts in their evolution and approaches to compassion.
 Compassion is simply a variation of love or sadness, not a distinct emotion.
 From the perspective of evolutionary psychology, compassion can be viewed as a distinct emotional state, which can be differentiated from distress, sadness, and love.
 Compassion as a synonym of empathic distress, which is characterized by the feeling of distress in connection with another person's suffering. This perspective of compassion is based on the finding that people sometimes emulate and feel the emotions of people around them.
 According to Thump ten Jinpa, compassion is a sense of concern that arises in us in the face of someone who is in need or someone who is in pain. And accompanied by a kind of a wishing (i.e. desire) to see the relief or end of that situation and wanting (i.e. motivation) to do something about it.

Emma Seppala distinguishes compassion from empathy and altruism as follows: "... The definition of compassion is often confused with that of empathy. Empathy, as defined by researchers, is the visceral or emotional experience of another person's feelings. It is, in a sense, an automatic mirroring of another's emotion, like tearing up at a friend's sadness. Altruism is an action that benefits someone else. It may or may not be accompanied by empathy or compassion, for example in the case of making a donation for tax purposes. Although these terms are related to compassion, they are not identical. Compassion often does, of course, involve an empathic response and altruistic behavior. However, compassion is defined as the emotional response when perceiving suffering and involves an authentic desire to help." According to Thupten Jinpa, compassion is not the following: Compassion is not pity, Compassion is not attachment, Compassion is not the same as empathetic feeling, Compassion is not simply wishful thinking, Compassion is not self-regard.

The more one person knows about the human condition and the associated experiences, the more vivid the route to identification with suffering becomes. Identifying with another person is an essential process for human beings, which is even illustrated by infants who begin to mirror the facial expressions and body movements of their mother as early as the first days of their lives. Compassion is recognized through identifying with other people (i.e. perspective-taking), the knowledge of human behavior, the perception of suffering, transfer of feelings, knowledge of goal and purpose changes in sufferers, and leads to the absence of the suffering from the group. Personality psychology agrees that people are inherently different and distinct from one another, which leads to the conclusion that human suffering is always individual and unique. Suffering can result from psychological, social, and physical trauma and it happens in acute forms as often as chronically. Due to the inherent differences in people's personalities some may define their early stages of suffering to their external circumstances and those life events being quiet or not discussed. The later stages may involve the person expressing their victimization and searching for help. Suffering has been defined as the perception of a person's impending destruction or loss of integrity, which continues until the threat is vanished or the person's integrity can be restored.  Compassion consists of three major requirements: People must feel that troubles that evoke their feelings are serious, the understanding that sufferers' troubles are not self-inflicted, and ability to picture oneself with the same problems in a non-blaming and non-shaming manner. The importance of identifying with others for compassion is contrasted by the negative physical and psychological effects of abandonment.

Compassion is often a characteristic element of democratic societies. The compassion process is highly related to identifying with the other person because sympathizing with others is possible among people from other countries, cultures, locations, etc. A possible source of this process of identifying with others comes from a universal category called "Spirit." Toward the late 1970s, very different cultures and nations around the world took a turn to religious fundamentalism, which has occasionally been attributed to "Spirit". The role of compassion as a factor contributing to individual or societal behavior has been the topic of continuous debate. In contrast to the process of identifying with other people, a complete absence of compassion may require ignoring or disapproving identification with other people or groups. Earlier studies established the links between interpersonal violence and cruelty which leads to indifference. Compassion may have the ability to induce feelings of kindness and forgiveness, which could give people the ability to stop situations that have the potential to be distressing and occasionally lead to violence. This concept has been illustrated throughout history: The Holocaust, genocide, European colonization of the Americas, etc. The seemingly essential step in these atrocities could be the definition of the victims as "not human" or "not us." The atrocities committed throughout human history are thus claimed to have only been relieved, minimized, or overcome its damaging effects through the presence of compassion, although recently, drawing on empirical research in evolutionary theory, developmental psychology, social neuroscience, and psychopathy, it also has been counterargued that compassion or empathy and morality are neither systematically opposed to one another, nor inevitably complementary, since over the course of history, mankind has created social structures for upholding truly universal moral principles to all humanity, such as Human Rights and the International Criminal Court. On one hand, Thomas Nagel, for instance, critiques Joshua Greene by suggesting that he is too quick to conclude utilitarianism specifically from the general goal of constructing an impartial morality; for example, he says, Immanuel Kant and John Rawls offer other impartial approaches to ethical questions. In his defense against the possible destructive nature of passions, Plato compared the human soul to a chariot: the intellect is the driver and the emotions are the horses, and life is a continual struggle to keep the emotions under control. In his apology of a solid universal morality, Immanuel Kant saw compassion as a weak and misguided sentiment: "Such benevolence is called soft-heartedness and should not occur at all among human beings", he said of it.

Psychology 
Compassion has become associated with and researched in the fields of positive psychology and social psychology. Compassion is a process of connecting by identifying with another person. This identification with others through compassion can lead to increased motivation to do something in an effort to relieve the suffering of others.

Compassion is an evolved function from the harmony of a three grid internal system: contentment-and-peace system, goals-and-drives system and threat-and-safety system. Paul Gilbert defines these collectively as necessary regulated systems for compassion.

Paul Ekman describes a "taxonomy of compassion" including: emotional recognition (knowing how another person feels), emotional resonance (feeling emotions another person feels), familial connection (care-giver-offspring), global compassion (extending compassion to everyone in the world), sentient compassion (extended compassion to other species), and heroic compassion (compassion that comes with a risk).

Indeed, Paul Ekman goes on further to make an important distinction between proximal (i.e. in the moment) and distal compassion (i.e. predicting the future; affective forecasting): "... it has implications in terms of how we go about encouraging compassion. We are all familiar with proximal compassion: Someone falls down in the street, and we help him get up. That's proximal compassion: where we see someone in need, and we help them. But, when I used to tell my kids, "Wear a helmet," that's distal compassion: trying to prevent harm before it occurs. And that requires a different set of skills: It requires social forecasting, anticipating harm before it occurs, and trying to prevent it. Distal compassion is much more amenable to educational influences, I think, and it's our real hope." Distal compassion also requires perspective-taking.

Compassion has been associated with important psychological outcomes including increases in mindfulness and emotion regulation.

Compassion fatigue 

According to Figley, individuals with a higher capacity or responsibility to empathize with others may be at risk for "compassion fatigue", also called "secondary traumatic stress", which is related to professionals and individuals who spend a significant amount of time responding to information related to suffering. However, newer research by Singer and Ricard suggests that it is lack of suitable distress tolerance which gets people fatigued in compassion activities. Individuals that are at risk for compassion fatigue usually display these four key attributes: diminished endurance and/or energy, declined empathic ability, helplessness and/or hopelessness, as well as emotional exhaustion. Negative coping skills can also increase the risk of developing compassion fatigue.

Smith mentions that people can alleviate the sorrow and distress by doing some self-care activities on a regular basis. Improving consciousness helps to guide people to recognize the impact and circumstances of past events. After people learn the experience from the situation in the past, they are able to find the causes of compassion fatigue in their daily life. Research suggests that practice of nonjudgmental compassion can prevent fatigue and burnout. Smith provides some methods that can help people to heal compassion fatigue. People should do physical activity, eat healthy food with every meal, create good relations with others, enjoy interacting with others in the community, write a journal frequently, and sleep enough every day. The practice of mindfulness and self-awareness has also been proven to help with compassion fatigue.

Conditions that influence compassion 
The psychologist Paul Gilbert provides factors that can reduce the likelihood of someone willing to be compassionate to another, these include (less): likability, competence, deservedness, empathic-capacity, (more) self-focused competitiveness, (more) anxiety-depression, (more) overwhelmed, and inhibitors in social structures and systems.

Compassion fade 

Compassion fade is the tendency of people to experience a decrease in empathy as the number of people in need of aid increases, the term created by Psychologist Paul Slovic. It is a type of cognitive bias that people use to justify their decision to help or lack of helping and ignoring certain information. The cognitive process involved is turning compassion in to compassionate behavior. First is the singular person's response to the group in need, followed by motivation to help that can lead to action.

In an examination of the motivated regulation of compassion in the context of large-scale crises, such as natural disasters and genocides, much research has established that people tend to feel more compassion for single identifiable victims than large masses of victims (the Identifiable victim effect). It is found that people only show less compassion for many victims than for single victims of disasters when they expect to incur a financial cost upon helping. This collapse of compassion depends on having the motivation and ability to regulate emotions. In laboratory research, psychologists are exploring how concerns about becoming emotionally exhausted may motivate people to curb their compassion for—and dehumanize—members of stigmatized social groups, such as homeless individuals and drug addicts.

Neurobiology
Olga Klimecki (et al.), have found differential (non-overlapping) fMRI brain activation areas in respect to compassion and empathy: compassion was associated with the mOFC, pregenual ACC, and ventral striatum. Empathy, in contrast, was associated with the anterior insula and the anterior midcingulate cortex (aMCC).

Jorge Moll and Jordan Grafman, neuroscientists at the National Institutes of Health and LABS-D'Or Hospital Network (J.M.) provided the first evidence for the neural bases of altruistic giving in normal healthy volunteers, using functional magnetic resonance imaging. In their research, published in the Proceedings of the National Academy of Sciences USA in October 2006, they showed that both pure monetary rewards and charitable donations activated the mesolimbic reward pathway, a primitive part of the brain that usually responds to food and sex. However, when volunteers generously placed the interests of others before their own by making charitable donations, another brain circuit was selectively activated: the subgenual cortex/septal region. These structures are intimately related to social attachment and bonding in other species. Altruism, the experiment suggested, was not a superior moral faculty that suppresses basic selfish urges but rather was basic to the brain, hard-wired and pleasurable. In one study conducted by Jill Rilling and Gregory Berns, neuroscientists at Emory University, subjects' brain activity was recorded while they helped someone in need. It was found that while the subjects were performing compassionate acts the caudate nucleus and anterior cingulate regions of the brain were activated, the same areas of the brain associated with pleasure and reward. One brain region, the subgenual anterior cingulate cortex/basal forebrain, contributes to learning altruistic behavior, especially in those with trait empathy. The same study has shown a connection between giving to charity and the promotion of social bonding and personal reputation. True compassion, if it exists at all, is thus inherently motivated (at least to some degree) by self-interest.

In fact, in an experiment published in March 2007 at the University of Southern California neuroscientist Antonio R. Damasio and his colleagues showed that subjects with damage to the ventromedial prefrontal cortex lack the ability to feel their way empathically to moral answers and that when confronted with moral dilemmas, these brain-damaged patients coldly came up with "end-justifies-the-means" answers, leading Damasio to conclude that the point was not that they reached immoral conclusions, but that when they were confronted by a difficult issue – in this case as to whether to shoot down a passenger plane hijacked by terrorists before it hits a major city – these patients appear to reach decisions without the anguish that afflicts those with normally functioning brains. According to Adrian Raine, another clinical neuroscientist at the University of Southern California, one of this study's implications is that society may have to rethink how it judges immoral people: "Psychopaths often feel no empathy or remorse. Without that awareness, people relying exclusively on reasoning seem to find it harder to sort their way through moral thickets. Does that mean they should be held to different standards of accountability?"

In another study, in the 1990s, Dr. Bill Harbaugh, a University of Oregon economist, concluded people are motivated to give for reasons of personal prestige and in a similar fMRI scanner test in 2007 with his psychologist colleague Dr. Ulrich Mayr, reached the same conclusions of Jorge Moll and Jordan Grafman about giving to charity, although they were able to divide the study group into two groups: "egoists" and "altruists". One of their discoveries was that, though rarely, even some of the considered "egoists" sometimes gave more than expected because that would help others, leading to the conclusion that there are other factors in the case in charity, such as a person's environment and values.

In a 2009 small fMRI experiment, Mary Helen Immordino-Yang and colleagues Andrea McColl, Hanna Damasio and Antonio R. Damasio at the Brain and Creativity Institute studied strong feelings of compassion for social and physical pain in others. Both feelings involved an expected change in activity in the anterior insula, anterior cingulate, hypothalamus, and midbrain, but they also found a previously undescribed pattern of cortical activity on the posterior medial surface of each brain hemisphere, a region involved in the default mode of brain function, and implicated in self-related processes. Compassion for social pain in others was associated with strong activation in the interoceptive, inferior/posterior portion of this region, while compassion for physical pain in others involved heightened activity in the exteroceptive, superior/anterior portion. Compassion for social pain activated this superior/anterior section, to a lesser extent. Activity in the anterior insula related to compassion for social pain peaked later and endured longer than that associated with compassion for physical pain. Compassionate emotions in relation to others has effects on the prefrontal cortex, inferior frontal cortex, and the midbrain. Feelings and acts of compassion have been found to stimulate areas known to regulate homeostasis, such as the anterior insula, the anterior cingulate, the mesencephalon, the insular cortex and the hypothalamus, supporting the hypothesis that social emotions use some of the same basic devices involved in other, primary emotions.

Compassion in practice

Medicine 
Compassion is one of the most important attributes for physicians practicing medical services. It has been suggested that felt compassion brings about the desire to do something to help the sufferer. That desire to be helpful is not compassion, but it does suggest that compassion is similar to other emotions by motivating behaviors to reduce the tension brought on by the emotion. Physicians generally identify their central duties as the responsibility to put the patient's interests first, including the duty not to harm, deliver proper care, and maintain confidentiality. Compassion is seen in each of those duties because of its direct relation to the recognition and treatment of suffering. Physicians who use compassion understand the effects of sickness and suffering on human behavior. Compassion may be closely related to love and the emotions evoked in both. This is illustrated by the relationship between patients and physicians in medical institutions. The relationship between suffering patients and their caregivers provides evidence that compassion is a social emotion, which is highly related to the closeness and cooperation between individuals.

Psychotherapy 

Compassion focused therapy, created by clinical psychologist Professor Paul Gilbert, focuses on the evolutionary psychology behind compassion: focusing on balancing of affect regulation systems (e.g. using affiliative emotions from the care-and-contentment system to soothe and reduce painful emotions from the threat-detection system).

Self-compassion 

Self-compassion is a process of self kindness and accepting suffering as a quality of being human. It has positive effects on subjective happiness, optimism, wisdom, curiosity, agreeableness, and extroversion. Kristin Neff and Christopher Germer have identified that there are three levels of activities that thwart self-compassion and they are self-criticism, self-isolation and self-absorption, they equate this to fight, flight and freeze responses. It has been found that parenting practices contribute to the development of self-compassion in children. Maternal support, secure attachment, and harmonious family functioning all create an environment where self-compassion can develop. On the other hand, certain developmental factors (i.e., personal fable) can hinder the development of self-compassion in children.

For increasing compassion in the workplace to self and others, authentic leadership centered on humanism and nourishing quality interconnectedness are considered as the key. Judith Jordan's concept of self-empathy is similar to self-compassion, it implies the capacity to notice, care and respond towards the ones own felt needs. The strategies of self-care involve valuing oneself, thinking about one's ideations of needs compassionately, and connecting with others in order to conversely experience renewal, support, and validation. Research indicates that self-compassionate individuals experience greater psychological health than those who lack self-compassion.

Religion and philosophy

Abrahamic religions

Christianity

The Christian Bible's Second Epistle to the Corinthians is but one place where God is spoken of as the "Father of mercies" (or "compassion") and the "God of all comfort."

Jesus embodies the very essence of compassion and relational care. Christ challenges Christians to forsake their own desires and to act compassionately towards others, particularly those in need or distress.

One of his most famous teachings about compassion is the Parable of the Good Samaritan (Luke 10:29-37), in which a Samaritan traveler "was moved with compassion" at the sight of a man who was beaten. Most significantly, he demonstrated compassion to those his society had condemned – tax collectors, prostitutes, and criminals, by saying "just because you received a loaf of bread, does not mean you were more conscientious about it, or more caring about your fellow man."

Conversely, a 2012 study of the historical Jesus has claimed that the founder of Christianity sought to elevate Judaic compassion as the supreme human virtue, capable of reducing suffering and fulfilling our God-ordained purpose of transforming the world into something more worthy of its creator.

Islam

In the Muslim tradition, foremost among God's attributes are mercy and compassion or, in the canonical language of Arabic, Rahman and Rahim. Each of the 114 chapters of the Quran, with one exception, begins with the verse, "In the name of Allah the Compassionate, the Merciful."

The Arabic word for compassion is rahmah. As a cultural influence, its roots abound in the Quran. A good Muslim is to commence each day, each prayer, and each significant action by invoking Allah the Merciful and Compassionate, i.e., by reciting Bism-i-llah a-Rahman-i-Rahim. The womb and family ties are characterized by compassion and named after the exalted attribute of Allah "Al-Rahim" (The Compassionate).

Judaism
In the Jewish tradition, God is the Compassionate and is invoked as the Father of Compassion: hence Raḥmana or Compassionate becomes the usual designation for His revealed word. (Compare, below, the frequent use of raḥman in the Quran). Sorrow and pity for one in distress, creating a desire to relieve it, is a feeling ascribed alike to man and God: in Biblical Hebrew, ("riḥam," from "reḥem," the mother, womb), "to pity" or "to show mercy" in view of the sufferer's helplessness, hence also "to forgive" (Hab. iii. 2), "to forbear" (Ex. ii. 6; I Sam. xv. 3; Jer. xv. 15, xxi. 7). The Rabbis speak of the "thirteen attributes of compassion." The Biblical conception of compassion is the feeling of the parent for the child. Hence the prophet's appeal in confirmation of his trust in God invokes the feeling of a mother for her offspring (Isa. xlix. 15).

A classic articulation of the Golden Rule (see above) came from the first century Rabbi Hillel the Elder. Renowned in the Jewish tradition as a sage and a scholar, he is associated with the development of the Mishnah and the Talmud and, as such, one of the most important figures in Jewish history. Asked for a summary of the Jewish religion in the "while standing on one leg" meaning in the most concise terms, Hillel stated: "That which is hateful to you, do not do to your fellow. That is the whole Torah. The rest is the explanation; go and learn." Post 9/11, the words of Rabbi Hillel are frequently quoted in public lectures and interviews around the world by the prominent writer on comparative religion Karen Armstrong.

Ancient Greek philosophy
In ancient Greek philosophy motivations based on pathos (feeling, passion) were typically distrusted. Reason was generally considered to be the proper guide to conduct. Compassion was considered pathos; hence, Justitia is depicted as blindfolded, because her virtue is dispassion - not compassion.

Stoicism had a doctrine of rational compassion known as oikeiôsis.

In Roman society, compassion was often seen as a vice when it was expressed as pity rather than mercy. In other words, showing empathy toward someone who was seen as deserving was considered virtuous, whereas showing empathy to someone deemed unworthy was considered immoral and weak.

Confucianism
Mencius maintained that everyone possesses the germ or root of compassion, illustrating his case with the famous example of the child at an open well:

"Suppose a man were, all of a sudden, to see a young child on the verge of falling into a well. He would certainly be moved to compassion, not because he wanted to get into the good graces of the parents, nor because he wished to win the praise of his fellow-villagers or friends, nor yet because he disliked the cry of the child".

Mencius saw the task of moral cultivation as that of developing the initial impulse of compassion into an enduring quality of benevolence.

Indian religions

Buddhism

The first of what in English is called the Four Noble Truths is the truth of suffering or dukkha (unsatisfactoriness or stress). Dukkha is identified as one of the three distinguishing characteristics of all conditioned existence. It arises as a consequence of not understanding the nature of impermanence anicca (the second characteristic) as well as a lack of understanding that all phenomena are empty of self anatta (the third characteristic).

When one has an understanding of suffering and its origins and understands that liberation from suffering is possible renunciation arises.

Renunciation then lays the foundation for the development of compassion. Having given rise to renunciation, compassion arises for others who also suffer.  
This is developed in stages:

 Ordinary compassion The compassion we have for those close to us such as friends and family and a wish to free them from the 'suffering of suffering'
 Immeasurable Compassion -This is the compassion that wishes to benefit all beings without exception. It is associated with both the Hinayana and Mahayana paths.

It is developed in four stages called The Four Immeasurables:  
 Loving kindness (Mettā)  
 Compassion (Karuṇā)
 Joy (Mudita)
 Equanimity (Upekṣā)

The American monk Bhikkhu Bodhi states that compassion "supplies the complement to loving-kindness: whereas loving-kindness has the characteristic of wishing for the happiness and welfare of others, compassion has the characteristic of wishing that others be free from suffering, a wish to be extended without limits to all living beings. Like metta, compassion arises by considering that all beings, like ourselves, wish to be free from suffering, yet despite their wishes continue to be harassed by pain, fear, sorrow, and other forms of dukkha."

 Great Compassion - This is practiced exclusively in the Mahayana tradition and is associated with the development of Bodhicitta.

The 14th Dalai Lama has said, "If you want others to be happy, practice compassion. If you want to be happy, practice compassion."

Hinduism
 

In classical literature of Hinduism, compassion is a virtue with many shades, each shade explained by different terms. Three most common terms are daya (दया), karuṇā (करुणा), and anukampā (अनुकम्पा). Other words related to compassion in Hinduism include karunya, kripa, and anukrosha. Some of these words are used interchangeably among the schools of Hinduism to explain the concept of compassion, its sources, its consequences, and its nature. The virtue of compassion to all living beings, claim Gandhi and others, is a central concept in Hindu philosophy.

Daya is defined by Padma Purana as the virtuous desire to mitigate the sorrow and difficulties of others by putting forth whatever effort necessary. Matsya Purana describes daya as the value that treats all living beings (including human beings) as one's own self, wanting the welfare and good of the other living being. Such compassion, claims Matsya Purana, is one of necessary paths to being happy. Ekadashi Tattvam explains daya is treating a stranger, a relative, a friend, and a foe as one's own self; it argues that compassion is that state when one sees all living beings as part of one's own self, and when everyone's suffering is seen as one's own suffering. Compassion to all living beings, including to those who are strangers and those who are foes, is seen as a noble virtue. Karuna, another word for compassion in Hindu philosophy, means placing one's mind in other's favor, thereby seeking to understand the best way to help alleviate their suffering through an act of Karuna (compassion). Anukampa, yet another word for compassion, refers to one's state after one has observed and understood the pain and suffering in others. In Mahabharata, Indra praises Yudhishthira for his anukrosha – compassion, sympathy – for all creatures. Tulsidas contrasts daya (compassion) with abhiman (arrogance, contempt of others), claiming compassion is a source of dharmic life, while arrogance a source of sin. Daya (compassion) is not kripa (pity) in Hinduism, or feeling sorry for the sufferer, because that is marred with condescension; compassion is recognizing one's own and another's suffering in order to actively alleviate that suffering. Compassion is the basis for ahimsa, a core virtue in Hindu philosophy and an article of everyday faith and practice. Ahimsa or non-injury is compassion-in-action that helps actively prevent suffering in all living things as well as helping beings overcome suffering and move closer to liberation.

Compassion in Hinduism is discussed as an absolute and relative concept. There are two forms of compassion: one for those who suffer even though they have done nothing wrong and one for those who suffer because they did something wrong. Absolute compassion applies to both, while relative compassion addresses the difference between the former and the latter. An example of the latter include those who plead guilty or are convicted of a crime such as murder; in these cases, the virtue of compassion must be balanced with the virtue of justice.

The classical literature of Hinduism exists in many Indian languages. For example, Tirukkuṛaḷ, written between 200 BC and AD 400, and sometimes called the Tamil Veda, is a cherished classic on Hinduism written in a South Indian language. It dedicates Chapter 25 of Book 1 to compassion, further dedicating separate chapters each for the resulting values of compassion, chiefly, vegetarianism or veganism (Chapter 26), doing no harm (Chapter 32), non-killing (Chapter 33), possession of kindness (Chapter 8), dreading evil deeds (Chapter 21), benignity (Chapter 58), the right scepter (Chapter 55), and absence of terrorism (Chapter 57), to name a few.

Jainism

Compassion for all life, human and non-human, is central to the Jain tradition. Though all life is considered sacred, human life is deemed the highest form of earthly existence. To kill any person, no matter their crime, is considered unimaginably abhorrent. It is the only substantial religious tradition that requires both monks and laity to be vegetarian. It is suggested that certain strains of the Hindu tradition became vegetarian due to strong Jain influences. The Jain tradition's stance on nonviolence, however, goes far beyond vegetarianism. Jains refuse food obtained with unnecessary cruelty. Many practice veganism.  Jains run animal shelters all over India. The Lal Mandir, a prominent Jain temple in Delhi, is known for the Jain Birds Hospital in a second building behind the main temple.

See also

References

External links 

 TED Prize winner Karen Armstrong's video lecture on compassion
 Mirrored emotion Jean Decety, University of Chicago
Compassion Is Weaved Throughout Our Nervous System, Researchers Have Found
 Daniel Goleman, psychologist & author of Emotional Intelligence, video lecture on compassion
 Dalai Lama on compassion, Rice University, May 2007.
 Professor Robert Thurman: Compassion is feeling the feelings of others

Emotions
Kindness
Giving
Suffering
Virtue
Religious ethics
Relational ethics
Social emotions
Moral psychology